The 37th New York State Legislature, consisting of the New York State Senate and the New York State Assembly, met from January 25 to April 15, 1814, during the seventh year of Daniel D. Tompkins's governorship, in Albany.

Background
Under the provisions of the New York Constitution of 1777, amended by the Constitutional Convention of 1801, 32 Senators were elected on general tickets in the four senatorial districts for four-year terms. They were divided into four classes, and every year eight Senate seats came up for election. Assemblymen were elected countywide on general tickets to a one-year term, the whole Assembly being renewed annually.

In 1797, Albany was declared the State capital, and all subsequent Legislatures have been meeting there ever since. In 1799, the Legislature enacted that future Legislatures meet on the last Tuesday of January of each year unless called earlier by the governor.

In 1812, Putnam County was split from Dutchess County, and in 1813 was apportioned 1 seat in the Assembly, taken from Dutchess. In 1813, Warren County was split from Washington County, but both remained together in one Assembly district.

On February 4, 1813, a caucus of 48 Democratic-Republican legislators nominated unanimously Gov. Daniel D. Tompkins for re-election. State Senator John Tayler was nominated for Lieutenant Governor with 32 votes against 16 for the incumbent DeWitt Clinton.

On February 11, 1813, a Federalist caucus, presided over by Egbert Benson, nominated Stephen Van Rensselaer for Governor, and Assemblyman George Huntington for Lieutenant Governor.

At this time the politicians were divided into two opposing political parties: the Federalists and the Democratic-Republicans.

Elections
The State election was held from April 27 to 29, 1813. Gov. Daniel D. Tompkins was re-elected; and State Senator John Tayler was elected Lieutenant Governor; both were Democratic-Republicans.

Jonathan Dayton (Southern D.), Lucas Elmendorf, Samuel G. Verbryck (both Middle D.), James Cochran, Samuel Stewart (both Eastern D.), Henry Bloom, Perley Keyes and Farrand Stranahan (all three Western D.) were elected to the Senate. Cochran and Stewart were Federalists, the other six were Democratic-Republicans.

Sessions
The Legislature met at the Old State Capitol in Albany on January 25, 1814; and adjourned on April 15.

James Emott (Fed.) was elected Speaker with 58 votes against 48 for William Ross (Dem.-Rep.). John F. Bacon (Dem.-Rep.) was elected Clerk of the Senate.

State Senate

Districts
 The Southern District (5 seats) consisted of Kings, New York, Queens, Richmond, Suffolk and Westchester counties.
 The Middle District (7 seats) consisted of Dutchess, Orange, Ulster, Columbia, Delaware, Rockland, Greene, Sullivan and Putnam counties.
 The Eastern District (8 seats) consisted of Washington, Clinton, Rensselaer, Albany, Saratoga, Essex, Montgomery, Franklin, Schenectady and Warren counties.
 The Western District (12 seats) consisted of Herkimer, Ontario, Otsego, Tioga, Onondaga, Schoharie, Steuben, Chenango, Oneida, Cayuga, Genesee, Seneca, Jefferson, Lewis, St. Lawrence, Allegany, Broome, Madison, Niagara, Cortland, Cattaraugus and Chautauqua counties.

Note: There are now 62 counties in the State of New York. The counties which are not mentioned in this list had not yet been established, or sufficiently organized, the area being included in one or more of the abovementioned counties.

Members
The asterisk (*) denotes members of the previous Legislature who continued in office as members of this Legislature.

Employees
 Clerk: John F. Bacon

State Assembly

Districts

 Albany County (4 seats)
 Allegany and Steuben counties (1 seat)
 Broome County (1 seat)
 Cattaraugus, Chautauqua and Niagara counties (1 seat)
 Cayuga County (3 seats)
 Chenango County (3 seats)
 Clinton and Franklin counties (1 seat)
 Columbia County (4 seats)
 Cortland County (1 seat)
 Delaware County (2 seats)
 Dutchess County (5 seats)
 Essex County (1 seat)
 Genesee County (1 seat)
 Greene County (2 seats)
 Herkimer County (3 seats)
 Jefferson County (2 seats)
 Kings County (1 seat)
 Lewis County (1 seat)
 Madison County (3 seats)
 Montgomery County (5 seats)
 The City and County of New York (11 seats)
 Oneida County (5 seats)
 Onondaga County (2 seats)
 Ontario County (5 seats)
 Orange County (4 seats)
 Otsego County (4 seats)
 Putnam County (1 seat)
 Queens County (3 seats)
 Rensselaer County (4 seats)
 Richmond County (1 seat)
 Rockland County (1 seat)
 St. Lawrence County (1 seat)
 Saratoga County (4 seats)
 Schenectady County (2 seats)
 Schoharie County (2 seats)
 Seneca County (1 seat)
 Suffolk County (3 seats)
 Sullivan and Ulster counties (4 seats)
 Tioga County (1 seat)
 Warren and Washington counties (5 seats)
 Westchester County (3 seats)

Note: There are now 62 counties in the State of New York. The counties which are not mentioned in this list had not yet been established, or sufficiently organized, the area being included in one or more of the abovementioned counties.

Assemblymen
The asterisk (*) denotes members of the previous Legislature who continued as members of this Legislature.

Employees
 Clerk: James Van Ingen
 Sergeant-at-Arms: David Olmstead
 Doorkeeper: Benjamin Whipple

Notes

Sources
 The New York Civil List compiled by Franklin Benjamin Hough (Weed, Parsons and Co., 1858) [see pg. 108f for Senate districts; pg. 122 for senators; pg. 148f for Assembly districts; pg. 188 for assemblymen]
 The History of Political Parties in the State of New-York, from the Ratification of the Federal Constitution to 1840 by Jabez D. Hammond (4th ed., Vol. 1, H. & E. Phinney, Cooperstown, 1846; pages 354–375)
 Election result Assembly, Broome Co. at project "A New Nation Votes", compiled by Phil Lampi, hosted by Tufts University Digital Library
 Partial election result Assembly, Clinton and Franklin Co. at project "A New Nation Votes" [gives only votes from Clinton Co.]
 Election result Assembly, Cortland Co. at project "A New Nation Votes"
 Election result Assembly, Dutchess Co. at project "A New Nation Votes"
 Election result Assembly, Essex Co. at project "A New Nation Votes"
 Election result Assembly, Greene Co. at project "A New Nation Votes"
 Election result Assembly, Herkimer Co. at project "A New Nation Votes"
 Election result Assembly, Kings Co. at project "A New Nation Votes"
 Election result Assembly, Onondaga Co. at project "A New Nation Votes"
 Election result Assembly, Queens Co. at project "A New Nation Votes"
 Election result Assembly, Rensselaer Co. at project "A New Nation Votes"
 Election result Assembly, Richmond Co. at project "A New Nation Votes"
 Election result Assembly, Suffolk Co. at project "A New Nation Votes"
 Partial election result Senate, Southern D. at project "A New Nation Votes" [gives only votes of Queens, Richmond and Suffolk Co.]
 Partial election result Senate, Middle D. at project "A New Nation Votes" [gives only votes of Dutchess and Greene Co.)
 Partial election result Senate, Eastern D. at project "A New Nation Votes" [gives only votes of Rensselaer Co.]
 Partial election result Senate, Western D. at project "A New Nation Votes" [gives only votes of Broome, Herkimer and Onondaga Co.]
 Election result, Speaker at project "A New Nation Votes"
 Election result, Council of Appointment at project "A New Nation Votes"

037
1813 in New York (state)
1814 in New York (state)
1813 U.S. legislative sessions